"Phase" is a song recorded by American rock band Pinegrove. The song was released on October 30, 2019 through Rough Trade Records, as the second single from the band's fourth studio album Marigold (2020). It was written by singer-songwriter Evan Stephens Hall; lyrically, the song examines insomnia and anxiety.

It became their first song to chart, peaking at number 34 on Billboard Adult Alternative Songs listing in 2020. It was also their first true music video, which depicts sleepwalking.

Background
"Phase" focuses on the inability to fall asleep, and struggling with intrusive thoughts. The song's release was accompanied by a statement from Hall:

Its music video was directed by Colin Read. In the clip, a man sleepwalks through the streets of Manhattan and steals a buskers' guitar before interrupting a band rehearsal.

Release and reception
"Phase" debuted in live concerts by the band; the studio rendition of the track premiered accompanying an announcement of Marigold on October 30, 2019.

Jon Caramanica of The New York Times interpreted its at times apathetic lyricism a reflection of the band's difficult chapter regarding Hall's accusation of sexual coercion. Hayden Goodridge, writing for Paste, considered it a return to form creatively, while also complimenting its slide guitar playing. Jon Young of Consequence of Sound found it among the better tracks on Marigold, enjoying its "rousing" and "tender" tone.

Personnel
Credits adapted from Marigold liner notes.
Pinegrove
 Evan Stephens Hall - guitar, vocals, percussion, piano, production
 Zack Levine - drums, vocals, percussion, mixing

Additional personnel
Josh Marré — bass guitar, guitar, lap steel guitar, vocals
Nick Levine — guitar, pedal steel guitar, baritone guitar, vocals, mixing
 Sam Skinner - guitar, synthesizer, production, mixing
 Nandi Rose Plunkett - vocals, piano, synthesizer
 Mike Levine - pedal steel
Doug Hall — piano, vocals

Charts

References

2019 singles
2019 songs
Pinegrove (band) songs